Fourth-seeded Mary Reitano defeated Renée Schuurman 6–2, 6–3 in the final to win the women's singles tennis title at the 1959 Australian Championships.

Seeds
The seeded players are listed below. Mary Reitano is the champion; others show the round in which they were eliminated.

 Sandra Reynolds (quarterfinals)
 Renée Schuurman (finalist)
 Lorraine Coghlan (quarterfinals)
 Mary Reitano (champion)
 Jan Lehane (semifinals)
 Mary Hawton (semifinals)
 Thelma Long (first round)
 Betty Holstein (second round)

Draw

Key
 Q = Qualifier
 WC = Wild card
 LL = Lucky loser
 r = Retired

Finals

Earlier rounds

Section 1

Section 2

External links
 

1959 in women's tennis
1959
1959 in Australian tennis
1959 in Australian women's sport